Phytophthora boehmeriae is an oomycete plant pathogen that causes disease on a wide range of host plants, including root rot of Mexican yellow pine and brown rot of Citrus fruits.

References

boehmeriae
Water mould plant pathogens and diseases
Cotton diseases